Jason Stewart (born 21 November 1981) is a former New Zealand middle-distance runner.

Junior years

Stewart is the former national record holder in the 800m for the u/18 (1.51.49) and u/20 (1.48.73) age group categories.

In 2000 he finished 7th over 800m at the IAAF World Junior Athletics Championship in Santiago, Chile.

Senior achievements

In addition to 2 National titles over 800m (2002,2006), Stewart represented New Zealand in the 2004 Olympic Games in Athens, the 2005 World Championships in Helsinki, the 2006 Commonwealth Games in Melbourne (5th place) and represented the Oceania region at the 2006 IAAF World Cup of Athletics in Athens (8th place) .

He achieved a career-best IAAF world ranking of 31 for the 800 meters in 2005

References

1981 births
Living people
New Zealand male middle-distance runners
Olympic athletes of New Zealand
People educated at Napier Boys' High School
Athletes (track and field) at the 2004 Summer Olympics
Athletes (track and field) at the 2006 Commonwealth Games
Commonwealth Games competitors for New Zealand